Guðmundur G. Þórarinsson (born 29 October 1939) is an Icelandic politician. He was a member of the Althing, representing the Progressive Party for the Reykjavík Constituency from 1979 to 1983 and from 1987 to 1991.

He chaired the Icelandic Chess Federation (ICF), from 1969 to 1974, and again from 1992.

Personal life
Guðmundur was born in Reykjavík on 29 October 1939, a son of Þórarinn Bjarnfinnur Ólafsson (1920–1977) and Aðalheiður Sigríður Guðmundsdóttir (1922–1990).

References

Living people
1939 births
Gudmundur G. Thorarinsson